The Hunter 27-3 and Hunter 27X are a family of American sailboats that were both designed by Glenn Henderson and both first built in 2006.

The Hunter 27-3 was originally marketed  by the manufacturer as the Hunter 27, but is now usually referred to as the 27-3 to differentiate it from the unrelated 1974 Hunter 27, 1989 Hunter 27-2 and later designs bearing the same name.

Production
The designs were built by Hunter Marine in the United States, but are now out of production.

Design

The Hunter 27-3 series are both small recreational keelboats, built predominantly of fiberglass. They have fractional sloop B&R rigs, plumb stems, reverse transoms, internally-mounted spade-type rudders controlled by wheels and fixed fin keels.

Variants

Hunter 27-3
The deep draft keel model displaces . A twin bilge keel model was also available for sale in the United Kingdom.
Hunter 27X
This model was designed as a racing version of the 27-3 using the same hull molds.

See also
List of sailing boat types

Related development
Hunter 27
Hunter 27-2
Hunter 27 Edge

Similar sailboats
Aloha 27
C&C 27
Cal 27
Cal 2-27
Cal 3-27
Catalina 27
Catalina 270
Catalina 275 Sport
Crown 28
CS 27
Edel 820
Express 27
Fantasia 27
Halman Horizon
Hotfoot 27
Hullmaster 27
Island Packet 27
Mirage 27 (Perry)
Mirage 27 (Schmidt)
Mirage 275
O'Day 272
Orion 27-2
Tanzer 27
Watkins 27

References

External links

Keelboats
2000s sailboat type designs
Sailing yachts
Sailboat type designs by Glenn Henderson
Sailboat types built by Hunter Marine